Sami Mahlio (born 12 January 1972) is a Finnish former professional footballer who played as a midfielder.

Club career
Mahlio played for VaKP, FC Haka and MYPA in his domestic Finland, before joining Norwegian club Odd Grenland in 1999, where he made his Tippeligaen debut on 13 May 1999, when he came off the bench for Frode Johnsen in a 5–0 defeat at Tromsø. He was a starter in the 2000 Norwegian Football Cup Final, which Odd won over Viking.

In 2003, he moved to Sandefjord, competing in the Norwegian First Division. He made his debut for the team on 13 April, coming on as a substitute for Geir Ludvig Fevang in a 2–0 win over Ørn Horten. The following year he moved to Pors, for whom he played his first match on 12 April 2004, when he was a starter in a 4–0 defeat at home to Start.

After his stint in Norway, Mahlio returned to his native Finland to play for Lahti. In 2006 he returned to Norway, to end his career with Tollnes.

International career
Mahlio made 25 appearances for Finland between 1995 and 2001.

Honours
MYPA
 Finnish Cup: 1995

Odd Grenland
 Norwegian Football Cup: 2000

References

External links
 
 

1972 births
Living people
People from Valkeakoski
Sportspeople from Pirkanmaa
Finnish footballers
Finland international footballers
FC Haka players
Odds BK players
Sandefjord Fotball players
Pors Grenland players
FC Lahti players
Veikkausliiga players
Eliteserien players
Norwegian First Division players
Expatriate footballers in Norway
Finnish expatriate footballers
Finnish expatriate sportspeople in Norway
Association football midfielders